Cover Ups is a compilation album by the Santa Cruz, California-based hardcore punk band Good Riddance, collecting all of the cover songs the band had previously released. It was released July 2, 2002 through Lorelei Records, a record label co-founded by the band's singer Russ Rankin.

Reception 
Kurt Morris of Allmusic gave Cover Ups two stars out of five, commenting that "Some of the tunes seemed marred by the band trying to be funny and instead being annoying (the snotty "na-na-na" chorus on 'I Melt with You,' the high-pitched girly shrieking on 'Leader of the Pack,' etc.) ... Highlights of the album would no doubt be the Kiss cover and Bill Stevenson of Black Flag, All, and the Descendents doing drums and guitar on the Black Flag tune ... cover albums are (in almost all cases) for fans only. Cover Ups is no exception."

Track listing

Personnel

Musicians 
 Russ Rankin – vocals; bass guitar on track 10; additional guitar on track 5
 Luke Pabich – guitar, backing vocals
 Chuck Platt – bass guitar on tracks 1–5 and 7–9
 Devin Quinn – bass guitar on track 6
 Rich McDermott – drums on tracks 1 and 6
 Sean Sellers – drums on tracks 2–5, 7, and 8
 Dave Wagenschutz – drums on track 9
 Bill Stevenson – drums and additional guitar on track 10

Production 
 Ryan Greene – producer, recording and mix engineer of tracks 1, 3, 5, and 8
 Andy Ernst – recording engineer of tracks 2 and 7
 Adam Krammer – assistant recording engineer of track 3
 Bill Stevenson – producer, recording and mix engineer of tracks 4, 9, and 10
 Stephen Egerton – producer, recording and mix engineer of tracks 4, 9, and 10
 Jason Livermore – producer, recording and mix engineer of tracks 4, 9, and 10; mastering
 Joe Logsdon – recording engineer of track 6
 Brant Dobson – cover art

References 

2002 compilation albums
Good Riddance (band) albums
Covers albums